Samuel Whittingham (24 February 1882 – 1958) was an English footballer who played as a half-back for Stoke, Burslem Port Vale, Crewe Alexandra, Blackpool, and Huddersfield Town. Throughout his playing career, Whittingham recorded over 100 Football League appearances and played in numerous FA Cup matches. He was the elder brother of Bob Whittingham, who was also an accomplished sportsman.

Career
Whittingham played for Goldenhill Wanderers and Stoke, before joining Burslem Port Vale in August 1903. He made his debut on 26 September 1903 in a 1–1 draw with Glossop, making a total of seven Second Division appearances in the 1903–04 season. He scored three goals in 31 league games in the 1904–05 season, bagging his first goal in the Football League on 17 December, in a 2–1 defeat to Bolton Wanderers at the Athletic Ground; he later claimed goals in 2–0 home wins over Grimsby Town and Doncaster Rovers in March. He played 31 league games in the 1905–06 campaign, but was later transferred to Crewe Alexandra in the summer of 1906. 

Transferring to Crewe Alexandra proved to be the most successful years of his career as Whittingham was part of the team that came runners-up in the Birmingham & District League and won the Cheshire Senior Cup with them in 1907. The tournament final was played against Macclesfield Town where they proceeded to win the match 2–0. Following his spell at Crewe Alexandra Whittingham went on to amass over 50 appearances for Blackpool over two seasons. In the latter half of his career he played for Huddersfield Town where he made one appearance in an FA Cup game in the 1910–11 season before ending his career with Mirfield United; a team who were founding members of the Yorkshire Combination.

Career statistics
Source:

Honours
Crewe Alexandra
Cheshire Senior Cup: 1907
Birmingham & District League runner-up: 1907-08

References
Specific

General
 

1882 births
1958 deaths
Footballers from Stoke-on-Trent
English footballers
Association football midfielders
Stoke City F.C. players
Port Vale F.C. players
Crewe Alexandra F.C. players
Blackpool F.C. players
Huddersfield Town A.F.C. players
Mirfield United F.C. players
English Football League players